Beloit USD 273 is a public unified school district headquartered in Beloit, Kansas, United States.  It includes Beloit, Randall, Scottsville, Simpson, Asherville, Solomon Rapids, and nearby rural areas.

Schools
The school district operates the following schools:
 Beloit Junior-Senior High School
 Randall Elementary School
 Beloit Elementary School

History
In 2009 it had absorbed some territory from Jewel USD 279 due to that district's dissolution.

See also
 Kansas State Department of Education
 Kansas State High School Activities Association
 List of high schools in Kansas
 List of unified school districts in Kansas

References

External links
 

School districts in Kansas
Education in Mitchell County, Kansas
Education in Cloud County, Kansas